The siege of Thorn was set during the Great Northern War, between Sweden and Saxony from May to October 14, 1703. The Swedish army was commanded by Charles XII of Sweden and the Saxon by General von Kanitz. The siege ended with a victory for Sweden, and the whole garrison surrendered to the Swedes.

References

 Karl Hoburg: Die Belagerungen der Stadt und Festung Thorn seit dem 17. Jahrhundert, Lambeck Verlag, Thorn 1844
 Anders Fryxell: Lebensgeschichte Karl's des Zwölften, Königs von Schweden, Band 1, Braunschweig 1861

Thorn
Thorn
Thorn 1703
Thorn 1703
History of Toruń